Petr Bystron (born 30 November 1972) is a German politician. He was a candidate for Munich North for the Bundestag during the German federal election in 2017 for the right-wing Alternative for Germany party.

Bystron moved to Germany with his parents in 1987 from the former Czechoslovakia. He was a member of the Free Democratic Party (FDP) from 2006 to 2013.

References

External links
 Official website

1972 births
Living people
Politicians from Olomouc
Free Democratic Party (Germany) politicians
Members of the Bundestag for Bavaria
Members of the Bundestag 2017–2021
Members of the Bundestag 2021–2025
Members of the Bundestag for the Alternative for Germany
German political scientists
German people of Czech descent